The Timaru by-election 1962 was a by-election held in the  electorate in Canterbury during the term of the 33rd New Zealand Parliament, on 21 July 1962.

Background
The by-election was caused by the resignation of incumbent MP Rev Clyde Carr of the Labour Party on 31 May 1962. Carr, who died on 18 September, had often been opposed to the party leaders.

Candidates

Labour
There were several names put forward for the Labour Party candidacy:

Neville Pickering, the former MP for 
Gordon Ray, the President of the Timaru Labour Representations Committee
Patrick Herman Weith, the President of the South Island Waterside Workers' Federation

Arthur was chosen after winning a ballot at a meeting of local party members.

National
Five people sought the National Party candidature, only one of whom was actually living in Timaru.

Norman Stanley Brown, a farmer of Pleasant Point and past president of the Waimate branch of Federated Farmers who was a nominee for the National nomination at the recent Waitaki by-election
Thomas Graham Scarf, a manufacturer from Waikanae
Maurice John O'Reilly, an insurance agent and law student at Otago University
Pearl Savin, the women's editor of the Timaru Herald

Quigley was chosen as the National candidate after winning a ballot at a meeting of local party members.

Social Credit
The Social Credit Party chose Maurice John Hayes as their candidate.

Result
Within the town of Timaru, there were polling booths in Caroline Bay, Church Street, Church Street West, College Road, Elizabeth Street, Evans Street, Grants Road, Grey Road, Courthouse, Kensington Methodist Hall, Watlington Sunday School, Queen Street, Seddon Street, Selwyn Street, Trafalgar Street, Wai-iti Road, and Woodlands Street. Outside of Timaru, there were polling booths in Claremont, Fairview, Gleniti, Kerrytown, Kingsdown, Levels, Otipua, Pareora, Rosewill, Salisbury, Seadown, and Washdyke.

The by-election was won by Sir Basil Arthur, also of the Labour Party. Even on the provisional result, with over 1,400 special votes yet to be counted published on 22 July (the day after polling day), it was clear that Arthur had won by a considerable margin. Overseas votes were allowed to be received until 31 July by the returning officer, P. W. J. Cockerill. There were 1206 special and overseas votes that were allowed, and 192 special and overseas votes that were disallowed.

Footnotes

Notes

References

Timaru 1962
1962 elections in New Zealand
Politics of Canterbury, New Zealand
July 1962 events in New Zealand